Türnitz is a town in the district of Lilienfeld in the Austrian state of Lower Austria.

Population

Climate
Mean annual temperature is 8.2 degree Celsius; annual precipitation is 1108.8 mm. Rainfall is at its highest in August at 136.6 mm, at its lowest in April at 59.4 mm. It is warmest in July, coolest in January.

References

Cities and towns in Lilienfeld District